Ockelbo-Lundgren was the nickname of Erik Lundgren (19 February 1919 – 16 September 1967), a Swedish racing driver that produced replica cars and boats under the name Ockelbo.

He first became known during the 1940s as "Trollkarlen från Ockelbo" (The Wizard from Ockelbo) when he participated in several races in a Ford 38 powered by a V8 engine with eight carburettors producing 280 hp – at speeds up to 220 km/h.

Lundgren built and sold tuning items and in the mid-1950s he heard about a burned-out Alfa Romeo Giulietta Sprint and got the idea to make his own bodywork for it. He made a fibreglass mould using Uffe Norinder's Ferrari 500 Mondial and then started making his own bodies. They were considered very good (according to some better than the original) and could take many different donors for chassis and drive line, like VW Beetle, Saab, DKW, MG, Simca, Porsche, etc. As of 2014, the Ockelbo-Ferrari was still made (under the Pagano brand).

Later Lundgren also made fibreglass boats, from the company Ockelbo-Båtar AB that was in business until 1979.

Formula One World Championship results
(key) (Races in bold indicate pole position; Races in italics indicate fastest lap)

References

External links 

 Ockelboklubben – a page for owners of Ockelbo boats
 Pagano – current makers of the Ockelbo body
 Ockelbo Plastindustrier AB
 Ockelbo T17i – owner of an Ockelbo boat
 Ockelborenoveringen – documents the restoration of an Ockelbo boat
  Ockelbo collection – Erik Lundgren: pictures and short story

1919 births
1967 deaths
Kit car manufacturers
Swedish racing drivers
Swedish Formula One drivers